Stephanie Kay Bentley (born April 29, 1963) is an American country music artist. She made her debut in 1996 as a duet partner on Ty Herndon's single "Heart Half Empty", which peaked at No. 21 on the Billboard Hot Country Singles & Tracks charts. The single was included both on Herndon's 1995 debut album What Mattered Most and on Bentley's 1996 debut album Hopechest. It produced three more singles for her on the country charts, although only one ("Who's That Girl") reached Top 40.

Bentley found success as a songwriter, having penned Faith Hill's 1999 crossover single "Breathe", as well as Martina McBride's 2002 Top 5 hit "Concrete Angel". She has also co-written album cuts for Céline Dion, Pam Tillis and Jo Dee Messina, and recorded "I Will Survive" for the 2003 film Holes and "Don't It Feel Good" for the 2005 film Must Love Dogs.

Biography

Early life
Bentley was born in Thomasville, Georgia and her musical interests began at age nine, when she, her sister, and a friend entered and won a talent contest. The three later toured briefly as a musical group, even singing for President Jimmy Carter, In 1984, she formed a band called Special Delivery.

Move to Tennessee
In 1991, she moved to Nashville, Tennessee, where she worked as a demo singer. One of the songs for which she sang a demo was "Shake the Sugar Tree", which later became a Top 5 hit when Pam Tillis recorded it for her 1992 album Homeward Looking Angel. Bentley's demo vocals were dubbed into Tillis' recording of the song.

1995–1997: Ty Herndon duet and Hopechest
After a failed deal with Liberty Records which produced no albums or singles, Bentley signed to Epic Records in 1995. Her first chart entry in 1996 was as a duet partner on Ty Herndon's single "Heart Half Empty", (from his debut album What Mattered Most) which peaked at No. 21 on the Billboard Hot Country Singles & Tracks charts. "Heart Half Empty" was followed by her first solo release for Epic, "Who's That Girl", which peaked at No. 32. This was the first single from her debut album Hopechest, issued by Epic that year. The album produced three more singles after "Who's That Girl", although these latter three singles—"Once I Was the Light of Your Life", "The Hopechest Song" and "Dead Ringer"—all failed to make Top 40.

1997–present: Songwriting
Although Bentley never charted or recorded an album after 1997, she found success writing songs for others, most notably "Breathe" by Faith Hill, which spent six weeks at the top of the Billboard country music charts in late 1999-early 2000 and became the Number One song of 2000 on the Billboard Hot 100 year-end countdown. Bentley also co-wrote Lorrie Morgan's 1998 single "I'm Not That Easy to Forget" with George Teren and Chris Waters and Martina McBride's 2002 single "Concrete Angel" with Rob Crosby. In addition, she wrote two singles for Gloriana: "Wild at Heart" in 2009 with Josh Kear and Matt Serletic, and "Can't Shake You" in 2012 with Tom Gossin and James T. Slater. Bentley also contributed the songs "I Will Survive" for the soundtrack of the 2003 film Holes and "Don't It Feel Good" for the soundtrack of the 2005 film Must Love Dogs.

Discography

Studio albums

Singles

Music videos

References

External links 
 

1963 births
People from Thomasville, Georgia
American women country singers
American country singer-songwriters
Living people
Epic Records artists
Country musicians from Georgia (U.S. state)
21st-century American women
Singer-songwriters from Georgia (U.S. state)